The 2019 Slovenian FIM Speedway Grand Prix was the second race of the 2019 Speedway Grand Prix season. It took place on June 1 at the Matija Gubec Stadium in Krško, Slovenia.

Riders 
First reserve Robert Lambert replaced Greg Hancock. The Speedway Grand Prix Commission also nominated Matic Ivačič as the wild card, and Nick Škorja and Denis Štojs both as Track Reserves.

Results 
The Grand Prix was won by Bartosz Zmarzlik, who beat Martin Vaculík, Leon Madsen and Patryk Dudek in the final. It was the fourth Grand Prix win of Zmarzlik's career, and his 18-point haul meant he moved to the joint-top of the overall standings with compatriot Dudek.

Heat details

Intermediate classification

References 

2019
Krško
Slovenia
Sports competitions in Slovenia
Speedway
Speedway